The 1972 All-Ireland Senior Football Championship was the 86th staging of the All-Ireland Senior Football Championship, the Gaelic Athletic Association's premier inter-county Gaelic football tournament. The championship began on 7 May 1972 and ended on 15 October 1972.

Offaly entered the championship as the defending champions.

On 15 October 1972, Offaly won the championship following a 1-19 to 0-13 defeat of Kerry in the All-Ireland final replay. This was their second All-Ireland title.

Offaly's Tony McTague was the championship's top scorer with 0-36. Offaly's Willie Bryan was the choice for Texaco Footballer of the Year.

Results

Connacht Senior Football Championship

Quarter-final

Semi-finals

Final

Leinster Senior Football Championship

First round

  

Second round

    
     
 
Quarter-finals

     
    

Semi-finals

   

Final

Munster Senior Football Championship

Quarter-finals

Semi-finals

Final

Ulster Senior Football Championship

Preliminary round

Quarter-finals
 

Semi-finals

Final

All-Ireland Senior Football Championship

Semi-finals

Finals

Championship statistics

Miscellaneous

 Omagh's pitch is named as Healy Park after Michael Healy.
 On 14 May 1972, FitzGerald Park, Killmallock hosted its first game for 20 years the Munster Quarter-Final meeting of Limerick vs Waterford.
 Tyrone qualify for the Ulster final for the first time since 1957.
 Donegal become the 8th team to win the Ulster title when they claim their first provincial championship with a 2-13 to 1-11 defeat of Tyrone.
 The All-Ireland semi-final meeting between Donegal and Offaly is the very first championship clash between the two teams. It is also Donegal's first championship match to be played at Croke Park, Dublin. 
 The All-Ireland final ends in a draw and goes to a replay for the first time since 1952.
 Offaly win back-to-back All-Ireland titles for the first and only time in their history. Their 1-19 to 0-13 All-Ireland final replay victory remains Kerry's biggest ever defeat in a championship decider.

Scoring

Overall

Single game

References